In Greek Mythology, Arcesius (also spelled Arceisius or Arkeisios) was the son of either Zeus or Cephalus, and king in Ithaca.

Mythology
According to scholia on the Odyssey, Arcesius' parents were Zeus and Euryodeia; Ovid also writes of Arcesius as a son of Zeus. Other sources make him a son of Cephalus. Aristotle in his lost work The State of the Ithacians cited a myth according to which Cephalus was instructed by an oracle to mate with the first female being he should encounter if he wanted to have offspring; Cephalus mated with a she-bear, who then transformed into a human woman and bore him a son, Arcesius. Hyginus makes Arcesius a son of Cephalus and Procris, while Eustathius and the exegetical scholia to the Iliad report a version according to which Arcesius was a grandson of Cephalus through Cillus or Celeus.

Zeus made Arcesius' line one of "only sons": his only son was Laertes, whose only son was Odysseus, whose only son was Telemachus.  Arcesius's wife (and thus mother of Laertes) was Chalcomedusa, whose origins are not mentioned further, but whose very name, chalcos ("copper") and medousa ("guardian" or "protectress"), identifies her as the protector of Bronze Age metal-working technology.

Arcesius line
Arceisiades was a patronymic from Arcesius, which Laertes as well as his son, Odysseus, is designated by.

Other
Of another Arcesius, an architect, Vitruvius (vii, introduction) notes: "Arcesius, on the Corinthian order proportions, and on the Ionic order temple of Aesculapius at Tralles, which it is said that he built with his own hands."

Notes

References 
 Homer. The Odyssey, Book XVI, in The Iliad & The Odyssey. Trans. Samuel Butler. p. 625. .

Kings in Greek mythology
Children of Zeus
Demigods in classical mythology
Ithacan characters in Greek mythology
Metamorphoses into humanoids in Greek mythology